Arthur Blickenstorfer (20 April 1935 – 27 October 2001) was a Swiss equestrian. He competed in two events at the 1968 Summer Olympics.

References

External links
 

1935 births
2001 deaths
Swiss male equestrians
Olympic equestrians of Switzerland
Equestrians at the 1968 Summer Olympics
People from Affoltern District
Sportspeople from the canton of Zürich
20th-century Swiss people